Wojciech Moranda (born 17 August 1988) is a Polish chess Grandmaster (2009).

Chess career 
Moranda won multiple Polish Junior Chess Championship medals: Two golds (2003 [U16]. 2007 [U20]), two silvers (2005 [U18], 2006 [U18]), and one bronze (2002 [U14]). He also won medals in the Polish Junior Rapid Chess Championship and often represented Poland at the World Junior Chess Championship and European Youth Chess Championship. In 2005, Moranda made his debut in the Polish Chess Championship final in Poznań, where he took 11th place. In 2009, he won the Rubinstein Memorial in Polanica-Zdrój. In 2010, he came in third at the Polish Blitz Chess Championship in Myślibórz. Moranda has also competed successfully in several Polish Team Chess Championships (team gold in 2014). In 2012, he won the Polish Student Championship in Katowice. Moranda represented Poland at the 2013 Summer Universiade where team Poland took mixed team bronze.

References

External links 

1988 births
Living people
Polish chess players
Chess grandmasters
Universiade medalists in chess
Universiade bronze medalists for Poland
Medalists at the 2013 Summer Universiade